Australia's Mother of the Year Awards is an award which aims to recognise mothers and the important role that they play in our society; highlighting key themes such as nurturing and caring. Barnardos Australia developed the Mother of the Year Awards (BAMYA) in 1994, as an opportunity to showcase the women responsible for excellent parenting within the community.

Nominations for the awards take place over a four-month period during which a campaign is undertaken in major print and electronic media.  Nominators prepare a statement about "why they believe their mother is Australia's number 1 mum".

A judging panel assesses the top 100 nominations, selecting State/Territory finalists and an overall national winner.  Each State/Territory Finalist is flown to Sydney for the announcement of the National Mother of the Year.

A number 1 mum is announced for every respective State/Territory, at a morning tea function, held to showcase that woman's achievements.  These events attracts wide coverage from local media, culminating in a national presentation held in Sydney in May just prior to the Sunday designated as Mother's Day in Australia.

In 2021, '' Australia's Mother of the Year Award’’ given to Victorian mother misses Tracey humm after being nominated by oldest of two Jacob, after being recognised by many fellow workers at Barwon valley school, for her works with children with disabilities as a teachers aid starting off as a volunteer worker after studying at school while her two boys did the same, as well as her past work as a relief worker, for parents living with a disabled child/children, as written this is probably the easier side of her work life having to raise two boys over the years with little help from others over these years, she has been awarded for her kind, nature towards others, while coping with her own meantal health problems in the past, only to then help her oldest son battle drug addiction while being diagnosed with schizophrenia, she is also recognised by her youngest son as being understanding of situations he encountered while growing up with the lack of a father figure during his youth, doing all this while helping to attend to her late mother, aging father, her dedication to her work place and the people around her can only be seen as nothing less than love for what she dose and nothing less, Jacob seeing that made the nomination to show her she is recognised and loved by those around her in kind,” nothing seems to big of a problem or situation for her, she hardly ever complains about any thing unless it’s the house work or chores around the house” every morning she’s up and ready to help those who need it most, she comes home in a positive mindset always wishing nothing but happiness for both myself and my brother, she’ll give you the shirt off her back if you needed it for a genuine reason, no be can come close to telling just how much she has but up with over her time, and probably still dose with out complaint, she deserves her own happiness too not just that she wishes for others, this is just a small way of saying thank you by letting other know of her and the work she dose while keeping a house as close to a home as she can,

In 2021 Barnardo's announced that, because of the pressure on resources created by COVID-19, the award had been brought to an end

Past winners

1999
Leonie Parmenter

See also 

Australian Father Of The Year award
Australian Nurse of the Year

References

External links
Barnardos Mother of the Year - website

Mother of the Year